The Schneeberg Railway is a local railway line in Lower Austria running from Wiener Neustadt to the Hochschneeberg mountain. From Wiener Neustadt to Puchberg am Schneeberg it runs as a standard gauge, adhesion railway (main section) and from Puchberg am Schneeberg to the Hochschneeberg as a narrow-gauge, cog railway (extension).
The main section from Wiener Neustadt to Puchberg am Schneeberg had a branch to Wöllersdorf from the outset. The section built later from Sollenau to Feuerwerksanstalt (extension) is now closed and renaturalised.

The line's name - the Schneeberg Railway (Schneebergbahn) - was not only used in the title of the original operating company, the  Schneeberg Railway Company Limited, (Actiengesellschaft der Schneebergbahn), but has also been adopted by its latest operator, the Lower Austrian Schneeberg Railway Company (Niederösterreichsche Schneebergbahn GmbH or NÖSBB) founded on 1 January 1997. However, the NÖSBB uses the name Schneebergbahn only for the cog railway section of the route.

Management 
Whilst the operation of the standard gauge section of the Schneeberg Railway is handled by the ÖBB, the management of the narrow-gauge rack railway is carried out by the Lower Austrian Schneeberg Railway Company founded in 1997, in which the state of Lower Austria - in the guise of the "Lower Austrian Transport Organization Company" (NÖVOG) - and the ÖBB each have a 50 percent share.

The journey time on the main section from Wiener Neustadt to Puchberg am Schneeberg takes regional trains approximately 45 minutes on the non-electrified single track. On average 15 to 20 Regionalzüge trains run in each direction daily.

The Schneeberg Railway on the extension line from Puchberg am Schneeberg to the Hochschneeberg is a narrow gauge rack railway that has become an important tourist attraction in southern Lower Austria, transporting 120000–130000 registered guests per year.

The journey up the mountain takes 53 minutes using modern coaches. Heritage trips using steam traction and the original carriages still take 1 hour, 17 minutes. The trains to the Hochschneeberg run hourly depending on demand. Adverse weather conditions can cause restrictions or changes to the train service. Services are operated from late April to late October depending on the weather. In addition, in April, special trips to the Hengst Hut are laid on.

Photos

See also 

 Austrian Federal Railways

References

Sources 
 Alfred Niel: Der Schneeberg und seine Bahn, Verlag Kurt Wedl, Melk 1967
 Informationsbroschüre der Österreichischen Bundesbahnen: Die Schneebergbahn seit 1897, ÖBB 1992
 Slezak: Vom Schiffskanal zur Eisenbahn – Wiener Neustädter Kanal und Aspang Railway (2. Auflage), Verlag Josef Otto Slezak, Wien 1989
 Alfred Luft: 75 Jahre Schneebergbahn 1897–1972, Verlag Verein der Freunde der Murtalbahn, Murau 1972
 Slezak: Schneebergbahn bei Wien (ESA Heft Nr. 18), Verlag Josef Otto Slezak, Wien 1985

External links 

 Austrian Federal Railways 
 Lower Austriaische Schneebergbahn 
 Gemeinde Puchberg

Railway lines in Austria
Wiener Neustadt-Land District
Wiener Neustadt
Neunkirchen District, Austria